Jasminka Cive (born ) is an Austrian female kickboxer and mixed martial artist, based in Austria. She competes professionally since 2005 and is the current ISKA Flyweight champion and mixed martial artist.

Biography

Born in Serbia, Jasminka Cive moved to Austria with her family at the age of 12. Already at age ten, she began training in Karate in her home. In Austria, she added kickboxing, Muay Thai and eventually added MMA to her sporting activities. In addition to being active in the sport she is also promoting martial arts events under the name "Mixfight Night" as well as fight Judge operate.

She is currently studying sports science. In May 2013 Jasminka Cive opened her own martial arts school named "Happy Fight" in Enns. She organized MMA seminars in German-speaking countries together with the German fighter Sheila Gaff. In December 2014, she survived a life-threatening blood infection.

Sporting career

Muay Thai and K-1

In 1998, at the age of 16 years Jasminka Cive started with K - 1 and Muay Thai . After a series of battles against known opponents in different weight classes and countries injuries forced her into a competition break of four years . After 4 operations Cive felt in 2007 that she was again ready for fighting, although it was recommended by a doctor page. Beating, she was " International Austrian Champion " in the K - 1 of the ISKA. In 2009, denied a boxing match against a male opponent, she won on points . Your opponent had to spend with a concussion in the hospital the following night . The title " Austrian Champion Full Muay Thai Rules" in the super flyweight of ISKA took Cive in 2010.  until the change to MMA, the end of 2010, she denied numerous other battles .  Their fight record in Muay Thai and K - 1 is at 17 wins, 6 losses and 1 draw .

Mixed martial arts

Jasminka Cive is one of the internationally best-known European MMA athletes and is, next to Sheila Gaff most successful in Germany. In all their struggles she was unbeaten between 2003 and 5 April-2013. Thereby the Austrian media were aware of them. The Austrian Broadcasting Corporation (ORF) dedicated her in 2012, a 30-minute report and also the private channel LT1 they presented in an article. At first she was training less than two years at the Ettl Bros. in Graz.

Already on 8 May 2010 denied Cive her first professional fight in Vienna against the Ukrainian Olga Denisenko. In Round 1 the fight for a submission hold (Arm-Triangle Choke) in favor of Jasminka Cive was over. When Grazer Cage Fight Series, one of the biggest MMA events in Europe it was up against the Germans Danny Rapf. This battle was incorporated into a 50-minute report of the Austrian TV station ATV on the life of Jasminka. The following three fights were all won by knockout or by Cive TKO. In Vaduz, Liechtenstein took place the battle for the world title in women's MMA MAX FC Union 17 March 2012. Through a TKO win in the third round against the Slovak Eva Henesova to Jasminka Cive also secures this item.

Titles
2010 – Max-FC Title, Kingdom Lichtenstein
2010 – ISKA / International Sport Kickboxing Association, Super-flyweight Champion (-53,5 kg) (Full Rules)
2007 – ISKA / International Sport Kickboxing Association, Super-flyweight Champion (-53,5 kg)

Mixed martial arts record

|Loss
|align=center|5–2
|Karolina Kowalkiewicz
|Submission (Armbar)
|KSW 22: Pride Time
|
|align=center|1
|align=center|3:53
|Gdańsk, Poland
|
|-
|Loss
|align=center|5–1
|Bec Rawlings
|Submission (Armbar)
|Invicta FC 5
|
|align=center|1
|align=center|3:30
|Kansas City, United States 
|
|-
|Win
|align=center|5–0
|Eva Henesova
|TKO (Punches)
|MAX FC 6 - Martial Arts Xtreme Fight Championship 6
|
|align=center|3
|align=center|2:10
|Vaduz, Liechtenstein 
|
|-
|Win
|align=center|4–0
|Lilla Vincze
|TKO (Punches)
|FS 6 - Weinpolter vs. Guelmino
|
|align=center|2
|align=center|2:44
|Graz, Austria
|
|-
|Win
|align=center|3–0
|Lilla Vincze
|KO (Punch)
|FOTN - Fight of the Night 2011
|
|align=center|2
|align=center|
|Bavaria, Germany
|
|-
|Win
|align=center|2–0
|Aniko Levi
|TKO (Knees and Punches)
|FOTN - Fight of the Night 2010
|
|align=center|2
|align=center|3:00
|Kitzbuhel, Austria
|
|-
|Win
|align=center|1–0
|Olga Denisenko
|Submission (Arm-Triangle Choke)
|Ultimate Cage Fighters 3 - Austria vs. Serbia
|
|align=center|1
|align=center|
|Vienna, Austria
|

See also
 List of female mixed martial artists
 List of female kickboxers

References

External links
 Jasminka Cive at Awakening Fighters

1981 births
Sportspeople from Belgrade
Serbian female kickboxers
Living people
Austrian female mixed martial artists
Serbian female mixed martial artists
Serbian Muay Thai practitioners
Strawweight mixed martial artists
Mixed martial artists utilizing Muay Thai
Mixed martial artists utilizing boxing
Flyweight kickboxers
Serbian emigrants to Austria
Austrian Muay Thai practitioners
Female Muay Thai practitioners